Sasek may refer to:

People
Amanda Sasek (born 1991), American beauty pageant titleholder

Places
Sasek Mały
Sasek Wielki